The 1949 Soviet Cup was an association football cup competition of the Soviet Union.

Competition schedule

Preliminary stage

Group Center

Quarterfinals
 DO Minsk                         3-0  DO Riga 
 Kalev Tallinn                    0-2  SPARTAK Vilnius

Semifinals
 [Sep 8] 
 DINAMO Kishinev                  3-2  Spartak Vilnius 
 DINAMO Kutaisi                   w/o  Spartak Yerevan 
 DO Minsk                         3-1  Spartak Minsk 
 Lokomotiv Ashkhabad              1-2  DINAMO Alma-Ata 
 Spartak Tbilisi                  0-0  DO Tbilisi 
 Zenit Frunze                     0-0  DO Tashkent

Semifinals replays
 SPARTAK Tbilisi                  2-0  DO Tbilisi 
 Zenit Frunze                     0-5  DO Tashkent

Finals
 [Sep 13] 
 DINAMO Kutaisi                   3-2  Spartak Tbilisi 
 DO Minsk                         2-1  Dinamo Kishinev 
 DO Tashkent                      3-2  Dinamo Alma-Ata             [aet]

Group 1 (Russian Federation)

Semifinals
 DINAMO Rostov-na-Donu            w/o  VVS-2 Moskva 
 DINAMO Voronezh                  2-1  Dinamo Krasnodar 
 SKIF Moskva                      w/o  Sudostroitel Sevastopol 
 SUDOSTROITEL Kaspiysk            3-1  MetroStroi Moskva 
 TRAKTOR Taganrog                 4-2  Pishchevik Astrakhan

Finals
 DINAMO Rostov-na-Donu            5-0  VMS Moskva 
 DINAMO Voronezh                  2-1  Sudostroitel Kaspiysk 
 SKIF Moskva                      2-3  TRAKTOR Taganrog

Group 2 (Russian Federation)

Quarterfinals
 DO Novosibirsk                   8-1  Metallurg Stalinsk 
 TSVETMET Kamensk-Uralskiy        3-2  Dinamo Sverdlovsk

Semifinals
 Bolshevik Omsk                   0-3  DO Novosibirsk 
 DINAMO Chelyabinsk               2-0  UralMash Sverdlovsk 
 Dzerzhinets Nizhniy Tagil        1-2  DO Sverdlovsk 
 KHIMIK Kemerovo                  3-0  Shakhtyor Kemerovo 
 KRYLYA SOVETOV Molotov           2-0  TsvetMet Kamensk-Uralskiy 
 Metallurg Magnitogorsk           0-2  DZERZHINETS Chelyabinsk

Finals
 DINAMO Chelyabinsk               3-2  Dzerzhinets Chelyabinsk 
 DO Sverdlovsk                    2-0  Khimik Kemerovo 
 KRYLYA SOVETOV Molotov           3-0  DO Novosibirsk

Group 3 (Russian Federation)

Quarterfinals
 METALLURG Moskva                 2-1  ZiS Dzerzhinsk

Semifinals
 Dinamo Lyubertsy                 0-4  TORPEDO Gorkiy 
 DO Leningrad                     2-1  Sudostroitel Leningrad 
 METALLURG Moskva                 3-0  Izhevskiy Zavod Izhevsk 
 MVO Moskva                       1-2  DINAMO Kazan               
 Spartak Penza                    0-2  DINAMO Saratov              [aet] 
 SPARTAK Ryazan                   3-2  Krylya Sovetov Gorkiy

Finals
 DO Leningrad                     7-0  Spartak Ryazan 
 METALLURG Moskva                 3-1  Dinamo Kazan 
 Torpedo Gorkiy                   1-1  Dinamo Saratov

Finals replays
 TORPEDO Gorkiy                   2-0  Dinamo Saratov

Group 4 (Russian Federation)

Quarterfinals
 KRASNOYE ZNAMYA Ivanovo          2-0  Spartak Ivanovo

Semifinals
 Dinamo Vladimir                  0-2  KOVROV 
 DZERZHINETS Kolomna              1-0  Stroitel Likino-Dulyovo   
 KRASNOYE ZNAMYA Orekhovo-Zuyevo  1-0  Carbolite Orekhovo-Zuyevo   [aet] 
 SPARTAK Kalinin                  2-1  Spartak Leningrad Region    [aet] 
 SPARTAK Noginsk                  3-1  Krasnoye Znamya Ivanovo

Finals
 KOVROV                           2-1  Zenit Kaliningrad           [aet] 
 KRASNOYE ZNAMYA Orekhovo-Zuyevo  3-1  Dzerzhinets Kolomna         [aet] 
 SPARTAK Noginsk                  3-2  Spartak Kalinin

Group Ukraine

Quarterfinals
 [Jun 16] 
 DINAMO Voroshilovgrad            1-0  Dinamo Chernovtsy 
 PISHCHEVIK Odessa                1-0  Dzerzhinets Kharkov 
 SPARTAK Lvov                     3-2  Sudostroitel Nikolayev 
 SPARTAK Uzhgorod                 1-0  Trudoviye Rezervy Voroshilovgrad 
 [Jun 28] 
 BOLSHEVIK Mukachevo              4-2  Spartak Kiev 
 SPARTAK Kherson                  5-0  DO Lvov

Semifinals
 AVANGARD Kramatorsk              w/o  Torpedo Kharkov 
 DO Kiev                          3-1  Metallurg Dnepropetrovsk    [aet] 
 Lokomotiv Zaporozhye             1-1  Spartak Uzhgorod 
 PISHCHEVIK Odessa                2-0  Dinamo Voroshilovgrad 
 SHAKHTYOR Kadiyevka              3-2  Bolshevik Mukachevo 
 SPARTAK Kherson                  w/o  Spartak Lvov

Semifinals replays
 LOKOMOTIV Zaporozhye             2-0  Spartak Uzhgorod

Finals
 DO Kiev                          3-1  Shakhtyor Kadiyevka 
 LOKOMOTIV Zaporozhye             w/o  Avangard Kramatorsk 
 SPARTAK Kherson                  w/o  Pishchevik Odessa

Final stage

Preliminary round
 [Sep 28] 
 Dinamo Chimkent                  0-0  DO Tashkent         [in Alma-Ata] 
 KRASNOYE ZNAMYA Orekhovo-Zuyevo  2-0  Dinamo Novosibirsk   
 KRYLYA SOVETOV Molotov           2-1  Krasny Metallurg Liepaja   
 ZiD Tbilisi                      1-2  DO Leningrad                [aet]

Preliminary round replays
 [Sep 29, Alma-Ata] 
 Dinamo Chimkent                  2-2  DO Tashkent 
 [Sep 30, Alma-Ata] 
 Dinamo Chimkent                  1-2  DO Tashkent

First round
 [Sep 28] 
 DO Bobruisk                      1-3  METALLURG Moskva 
   [I.Ruban 35 – Butenin 60, Zarkovskiy 61, Suetin 63] 
 [Oct 5] 
 Burevestnik Frunze               0-1  DINAMO Chelyabinsk 
 CDKA-3 Moskva                    1-2  DINAMO Voronezh 
 Dinamo Petrozavodsk              2-5  LOKOMOTIV Zaporozhye 
 DINAMO Stalinabad                2-1  DO Kiev 
   [Y.Piskunyan, B.Gachegov - ?] 
 Dinamo Tallinn                   1-4  DINAMO Rostov-na-Donu 
 DINAMO Tashkent                  2-0  Traktor Taganrog 
 DO Leningrad                     1-0  Lokomotiv Moskva 
 DO Tashkent                      1-2  KRYLYA SOVETOV Kuibyshev 
 DO Yerevan                       1-3  SPARTAK Kherson 
 Inkaras Kaunas                   2-2  Dinamo Kutaisi 
 KKF Baku                         1-3  SPARTAK Noginsk 
 KRYLYA SOVETOV Molotov           3-1  Daugava Riga 
 Lokomotiv Kishinev               2-7  KOVROV 
 Spartak Ashkhabad                0-4  TORPEDO Gorkiy 
 VVS Kharkov                      3-1  DO Minsk 
 VVS Moskva                       1-1  Krasnoye Znamya Orekhovo-Zuyevo    
 ZAVOD PROGRESS Leningrad         2-1  DO Sverdlovsk

First round replays
 [Oct 6] 
 INKARAS Kaunas                   4-2  Dinamo Kutaisi 
 VVS Moskva                       0-2  KRASNOYE ZNAMYA Orekhovo-Zuyevo

Second round
 [Oct 4] 
 DINAMO Rostov-na-Donu            3-2  Dinamo Leningrad                 [in Moskva] 
   [Bogatello-2, Piskovatskiy – Pyotr Dementyev, Vasiliy Lotkov] 
 [Oct 9] 
 LOKOMOTIV Kharkov                2-1  Dinamo Chelyabinsk    
   [Mikhail Labunskiy, ? – I.Bugrov] 
 Zavod Progress Leningrad         1-3  NEFTYANIK Baku 
   [? – Nikolai Rasskazov-2, Isai Abramashvili] 
 [Oct 11] 
 KOVROV                           1-0  Shakhtyor Stalino 
   [A.Kuznetsov] 
 [Oct 12] 
 Lokomotiv Zaporozhye             1-3  DINAMO Tbilisi           [aet] 
   [P.Ponomaryov – Viktor Panyukov, Andrei Zazroyev, Nikolai Todria] 
 [Oct 16] 
 DINAMO Stalinabad                1-0  Dinamo Yerevan 
   [Y.Yefremov 10] 
 Dinamo Tashkent                  1-1  Torpedo Stalingrad 
   [? – Pyotr Kalmykov] 
 Spartak Noginsk                  1-5  SPARTAK Moskva 
   [Kuznetsov – Nikita Simonyan-2, Nikolai Dementyev, Konstantin Ryazantsev, Alexei Paramonov] 
 Torpedo Gorkiy                   1-1  Dinamo Kiev 
   [A.Suryaninov 53 – Fyodor Dashkov 78] 
 VVS Kharkov                      1-3  TORPEDO Moskva 
   [Gusarov – Alexandr Ponomaryov-2, Nikolai Yefimov] 
 [Oct 18] 
 DINAMO Moskva                   10-0  Metallurg Moskva 
   [Vladimir Savdunin 10, 58, 72, Ivan Konov 34, 44, 61, Konstantin Beskov 39 pen, 41, Alexandr Malyavkin 42, Sergei Solovyov 85] 
 Dinamo Voronezh                  0-7  CDKA Moskva 
 DO Leningrad                     4-1  Krasnoye Znamya Orekhovo-Zuyevo  [in Moskva] 
   [Zhivopistsev-3, Zatyosov – Pryakhin]   
 Inkaras Kaunas                   0-3  ZENIT Leningrad 
   [Friedrich Maryutin 30, Ivan Komarov 72, 80] 
 Krylya Sovetov Molotov           0-2  KRYLYA SOVETOV Kuibyshev         [in Moskva] 
   [Boris Smyslov, Fyodor Novikov] 
 Spartak Kherson                  0-0  Dinamo Minsk

Second round replays
 [Oct 17] 
 Dinamo Tashkent                  0-2  TORPEDO Stalingrad 
   [Viktor Shvedchenko, Serafim Arzamastsev] 
 Torpedo Gorkiy                   0-3  DINAMO Kiev 
   [V.Tsvetkov (T) og, A.Shchanov, Fyodor Dashkov] 
 [Oct 19] 
 SPARTAK Kherson                  2-1  Dinamo Minsk 
   [V.Otorvin 67, Chokas 70 – Makarov 18]

Third round
 [Oct 17] 
 Dinamo Rostov-na-Donu            1-3  NEFTYANIK Baku 
   [Kuznetsov 84 – Yevgeniy Shagarov 6, Alekper Mamedov 30, ?] 
 [Oct 19] 
 DINAMO Tbilisi                   4-0  Kovrov 
   [Revaz Makharadze-2, Avtandil Gogoberidze, Nikolai Todria] 
 [Oct 20] 
 SPARTAK Moskva                   4-1  Dinamo Kiev 
   [Sergei Salnikov 12, 61, Nikita Simonyan 48, Viktor Terentyev 72 – Mikhail Mikhalina 22] 
 [Oct 22] 
 DINAMO Moskva                    3-0  Dinamo Stalinabad 
   [Konstantin Beskov 30, Vladimir Tsvetkov 39, D.Sokolov (DS) 79 og] 
 SPARTAK Kherson                  1-0  DO Leningrad              [in Moskva] 
   [G.Goncharov 63] 
 TORPEDO Moskva                   1-0  Krylya Sovetov Kuibyshev  [aet] 
   [Viktor Ponomaryov 117] 
 [Oct 23] 
 CDKA Moskva                      3-2  Lokomotiv Kharkov         [aet]
   [Vsevolod Bobrov 21, Valentin Nikolayev 39, Grigoriy Fedotov 110 – Ivan Boboshko, Georgiy Borzenko] 
 Zenit Leningrad                  0-0  Torpedo Stalingrad        [in Moskva]

Third round replays
 [Oct 24, Moskva] 
 ZENIT Leningrad                  1-0  Torpedo Stalingrad 
   [Vyacheslav Solovyov 11]

Quarterfinals
 [Oct 25] 
 TORPEDO Moskva                   3-2  Neftyanik Baku 
   [Viktor Ponomaryov 55, Alexandr Ponomaryov ?, Vladimir Nechayev ? – Nikolai Rasskazov 44, Grigoriy Duganov (T) 47 og] 
 [Oct 26] 
 DINAMO Moskva                    3-1  Dinamo Tbilisi 
   [Konstantin Beskov 1, Vladimir Tsvetkov 67, Vladimir Savdunin 88 – Revaz Makharadze 69] 
 SPARTAK Moskva                   7-1  Spartak Kherson 
   [Sergei Salnikov-4, Nikolai Dementyev-2, Nikita Simonyan – I.Zdor] 
 [Oct 27] 
 CDKA Moskva                      2-0  Zenit Leningrad 
   [Vsevolod Bobrov 3, Valentin Nikolayev 65]

Semifinals
 [Oct 30] 
 Dinamo Moskva                    2-2  Spartak Moskva 
   [Ivan Konov 27, Vladimir Ilyin 30 – Sergei Salnikov 20, 90] 
 [Oct 31] 
 TORPEDO Moskva                   2-1  CDKA Moskva 
   [Vladimir Nechayev, Alexandr Ponomaryov – Alexei Grinin]

Semifinals replays
 [Oct 31] 
 DINAMO Moskva                    2-1  Spartak Moskva 
   [Ivan Konov 78, Mikhail Semichastny 80 – Nikita Simonyan 12]

Final

External links
 Complete calendar. helmsoccer.narod.ru
 1949 Soviet Cup. Footballfacts.ru
 1949 Soviet football season. RSSSF

Soviet Cup seasons
Cup
Soviet Cup
Soviet Cup